Godfall is an action role-playing game developed by Counterplay Games and published by Gearbox Publishing. The game was released on PlayStation 5 and Windows on November 12, 2020. The game was also released for the PlayStation 4 on August 10, 2021. An enhanced version of the game containing all downloadable content up to that point, titled Godfall: Ultimate Edition, was released for PlayStation 4, PlayStation 5, Windows, Xbox One and Xbox Series X/S on April 7, 2022.

Gameplay
The game is set in a high fantasy setting, split into the realms of Earth, Water, Air, where players take the role of one of the last exalted Knight's Order to prevent a major apocalyptic event. The player has 5 weapon classes to select from, based on which of their armor sets, Valorplates, they equip. These weapon classes include the longsword, dual blades, polearm, two handed war hammer and the two handed great sword. Additional Valorplates and Augments can be equipped to customize how this character class plays out. It supports single player and up to three players in cooperative mode. The game is described as a "looter-slasher" being based on the loot shooter concept of completing missions and gaining better loot for further quests, the focus of the combat is on melee attacks rather than ranged ones.

Development
The game was developed by Counterplay Games, a 75-person studio in California with several developers that had worked on other loot shooters such as Destiny 2, their prior game being Duelyst. Counterplay engaged with Kowloon Nights to gain funding to help develop Godfall by September 2018 as a triple-A title, and avoid some of the struggles they had with funding Duelyst through a Kickstarter campaign.

The game's world was inspired by The Stormlight Archive, The First Law and the Foundation series, while the gameplay from the Monster Hunter series inspired the variety of weapons and combo mechanics.

Marketing and release
The game's first trailer was revealed in December 2019 at The Game Awards, where it was identified to be the first game confirmed for release on the PlayStation 5, due to be released on November 12, 2020. The game was developed with Unreal Engine 4.

At their E3 2021 press conference, Gearbox announced that Godfall will release on PlayStation 4 on August 10, 2021. It will come alongside an expansion called Fire and Darkness.

Reception

Godfall received "mixed or average" reviews, according to review aggregator Metacritic.

Sales

Godfall sold 5,342 physical copies within its first week on sale in Japan, making it the 21st-bestselling retail game of the week in the country.

Notes

References

External links
 

2020 video games
Action role-playing video games
Fantasy video games
Unreal Engine games
PlayStation 4 games
PlayStation 5 games
Video games developed in the United States
Windows games
Xbox One games
Xbox Series X and Series S games
Gearbox Software games
Multiplayer and single-player video games
Online-only games